Invisible Chains (Italian: Catene invisibili) is a 1942 Italian drama film directed by Mario Mattoli and starring Alida Valli, Carlo Ninchi and Giuditta Rissone. It was shot at the Cinecittà Studios in Rome. The film's sets were designed by the art directors Ottavio Scotti and Mario Rappini.

Plot
Following the death of her industrialist father, a young socialite inherits his business empire. Discovering that she has an illegitimate half-brother, she tries to assist him by finding him employment in the factory, but his criminal behaviour lets her down. Finally, she finds love and companionship in the engineer who runs the factory on her behalf.

Cast
 Alida Valli as Elena Silvagni
 Carlo Ninchi as Carlo Danieli
 Giuditta Rissone as La signora Matilde Silvagni
 Andrea Checchi as Enrico Leni, il fratellastro
 Jone Morino as La madre di Enrico
 Carlo Campanini as Cesare Tani
 Luigi Almirante as Un amico dei Silvagni
 Ada Dondini as La fioraia
 Armando Migliari as Il commissario
 Augusto Marcacci as Il direttore dell'albergo
 Arturo Bragaglia as Il cameriere di casa Tani
 Cesare Fantoni as Il maggiordomo di casa Silvagni
 Ciro Berardi as Giulio Berri 
 Paolo Bonecchi as L'avvocato della querela 
 Armida Bonocore as La segretaria di Danieli 
 Giovanni Cimara as Un industriale di Milano 
 Giorgio Costantini as Il mediatore 
 Giovanni Dolfini as Il direttore della prigione 
 Oreste Fares as Il notaio 
 Adolfo Geri as Marini 
 Virgilio Gottardi as Un amico tennista di Elena 
 Delia Lancelotti as Un'amica di Elena 
 Renato Malavasi as L'impiegato dell'albergo 
 Nino Marchesini as Un membro del consiglio d'amministrazione 
 Carlo Mariotti as Il segretario del commissario 
 Patrizia Muller as Un' amica di Elena 
 Giovanni Petrucci as Gino, il barista 
 Aldo Pini as L'equivoco compagno di Enrico 
 Mirella Scriatto as Daniela, la commessa fioraia 
 Elide Spada as Claretta 
 Umberto Spadaro as Un amico di Enrico al biliardo 
 Gioconda Stari as Una cameriera di casa Silvagni 
 Guido Verdiani as Il dottore Moretti 
 Leonello Zanchi as Un impiegato di Danieli

References

Bibliography
 Gundle, Stephen. Mussolini's Dream Factory: Film Stardom in Fascist Italy. Berghahn Books, 2013.

External links

1942 films
1940s Italian-language films
Italian black-and-white films
Films directed by Mario Mattoli
Italian drama films
1942 drama films
Films shot at Cinecittà Studios
1940s Italian films